Vasilis N. Triantafillidis (7 May 1940 – 21 May 2018), also known by his artistic nickname Harry Klynn (Χάρρυ Κλυνν), was a Greek comedian and singer.

He died on 21 May 2018, aged 78.

Discography

Albums 
 Χάρρυ Κλυνν Μουσική Γιώργος Κριμιζάκης* – Για Δέσιμο..   2 versions, Columbia, 1978		
 Δοξάστε Με, 2 versions, Columbia, 1979		
 Γεώργιος Σουρής , Χάρρυ Κλυνν , Μουσική Τάκης Μπουγάς – Αφιέρωμα  2 versions, Columbia, Παραγωγές Ντεπώ, 1981		
 Πατάτες   2 versions, Columbia, 1981		
 Μαλακά Πιο Μαλακά (LP, Album, Gre), Columbia, 14C 064-1700311, 064-1700311, 1984		
 Έθνος Ανάδελφον   2 versions, Polydor, 1985		
 Natin – Fatin   3 versions, Polydor, 1987		
 Τίποτα (LP, Album), Polydor, 831 854-1, 831854-1, 1987		
 Ραντεβού Με Την... Εισαγγελία (3xLP, Album), Polydor, 839 382-1, 839382-1, 1989		
 Αποκάλυψις   2 versions, Polydor, 1990		
 Γρανίτα Από Τζατζίκι   3 versions, Polydor, Polygram, 1992		
 The X Harry Klynn Files Ανάποδα (CD, Album), Mercury, 536825 2, 1997

Singles and EPs 
 "Αποκάλυψις" Κιλε – Κιλε , Οικουμενικό Τραγούδι (12", Maxi, Promo), PolyGram Records S.A. (Greece), 91184	, 1990		
 Χάρρυ Κλυνν, Γιώργος Μαρίνος – Κούλα... Χαράλαμπε – Κάνε Μου Λιγάκι Μμμ... (CD, Single, Mixed)	Minos (2)	8243 8 85942 2 6, 1998

Compilations 
 Και Πάσης Ελλάδος... (LP, Comp), Columbia, 062-1700661	1985		
 Κλασσικά Ηχογραφημένα (CD, Comp), Minos-EMI, 7243 5 37478 2 4	2002

References

External links
Official Harry Klynn homepage

1940 births
2018 deaths
Greek male actors
Greek comedians
Greek male film actors
Actors from Thessaloniki